This is the complete list of Asian Winter Games medalists in ski jumping from 2003 to 2017.

Men

Normal hill individual

Large hill individual

Normal hill team

Large hill team

References

External links
 2003 Results
 2011 Results

Ski jumping
medalists